Vanda curvifolia is a species of orchid found in Assam India, eastern Himalayas, Nepal, Myanmar, Thailand, Laos, southern China and Vietnam. It was formerly known as Ascocentrum curvifolium.

External links 
 

curvifolia
Orchids of Assam
Orchids of Myanmar
Orchids of Laos
Orchids of Nepal
Orchids of Thailand
Orchids of Vietnam